Mother o' Dreams is a 1921 American silent Western film produced by Cyrus J. Williams and distributed by Pathé Exchange. It was directed by Robert North Bradbury and stars Tom Santschi and Ruth Stonehouse.

This short film was part of the "Santschi Series", which included the other short films The Honor of Rameriz, The Spirit of the Lake, The Heart of Doreon, and Lorraine of the Timberlands, all of which starred Santschi.

There is an unrelated 1914 Essanay short film with the same title which starred Richard C. Travers, Gerda Holmes, and Bryant Washburn.

Plot 
Wandering artist (Santschi) encounters a young girl (Stonehouse) and her grandmother who are being victimized by the grandmother's son, who seeks to take control of her property. The artist intervenes, preserving the grandmother's property, independence, and ability to care for her granddaughter.

Cast 
 Tom Santschi
 Ruth Stonehouse

Reception 
Santschi's performance was well-received.

References

External links 
 
 Lobby card

1921 films
1921 Western (genre) films
American black-and-white films
Silent American Western (genre) films
1920s American films